Leo Rudolf Raubal Jr. (2 October 1906 – 18 August 1977) was an Austrian nephew of Adolf Hitler who served in the German Luftwaffe during World War II.

Life
Leo Raubal Jr. was the son of Leo Raubal Sr. and his wife Angela, Adolf's half-sister.

Raubal Jr. worked in Salzburg as a teacher of chemistry. He visited his mother sporadically while she was living in Berchtesgaden.

Like his younger cousin Heinz Hitler but unlike cousin William Patrick Hitler, Leo Raubal was a "favorite nephew of the leader", and Hitler liked to spend his time with him. However, according to William Patrick Hitler, Leo did not like his uncle Adolf and blamed the latter for the death of his sister Geli. This, however, cannot be confirmed, with Leo saying in 1967 that Hitler was "absolutely innocent", according to historian Werner Maser.

World War II and detention in Moscow
Before the war, he became a manager of the Linz Steelworks. In October 1939, he was drafted into the Luftwaffe and was a lieutenant in the engineering corps. He looked similar to Adolf Hitler and sometimes served as Hitler's double during the war.

He was injured in January 1943 during the Battle of Stalingrad, and Friedrich Paulus asked Hitler for a plane to evacuate Raubal to Germany. Hitler refused and Raubal was captured by the Soviets on 31 January 1943.

Hitler gave orders to examine the possibility of a prisoner exchange with the Soviets for Stalin's son Yakov Dzhugashvili, who had been captured by the Germans on 16 July 1941. Stalin refused to exchange him either for Raubal or for Friedrich Paulus, and said "war is war." Raubal was detained in Moscow's jails and was released by the Soviets on 28 September 1955, and returned to Austria.

Post-detention career
He lived and worked in Linz as a teacher. He died during a vacation in Spain. He was buried on 7 September 1977 in Linz. Leo Raubal Jr. had a son Peter (b. 1931) who along with Elfriede Raubal's son, Heiner Hochegger (b. 1945), and William Patrick Hitler's three surviving sons Alexander Adolf (b. 1949), Louis (b. 1951), and Brian William (b. 1965) are the closest living relatives to Adolf Hitler. Peter Raubal is a retired engineer who lives in Linz, Austria.

See also
Hitler family

References

Sources
 Werner Maser: Adolf Hitler. Mythos, Legende, Wirklichkeit, Bechtle, Munich 200118; 
 Werner Maser: Fälschung, Dichtung und Wahrheit über Hitler und Stalin, Olzog, 2004, page 272
 
 Walter Mayr: SERIE - TEIL 10 HITLERS FRÜHE JAHRE - DER FÜHRER, MEIN ONKEL, Der Spiegel  Nr. 28/2001 - 9 July 2001, page 142
 Marc Vermeeren: De jeugd van Adolf Hitler 1889–1907 en zijn familie en voorouders, Uitgeverij Aspekt, Soesterberg 2007, 
 Oliver Halmburger, Thomas Staehler: Familie Hitler. Im Schatten des Diktators, Oliver Halmburger Loopfilm GmbH, Munich, and ZDF-History, Mainz 2005 (film), DVD, ASIN B000U6SOKW
 
 Personal information from prof. Dr. Werner Maser (via German Wikipedia)

Hitler family
1906 births
1977 deaths
German prisoners of war in World War II held by the Soviet Union
Military personnel from Linz
Austrian schoolteachers